The icosahedral pyramid is a four-dimensional convex polytope, bounded by one icosahedron as its base and by 20 triangular pyramid cells which meet at its apex. Since an icosahedron's circumradius is less than its edge length, the tetrahedral pyramids can be made with regular faces.

Having all regular cells, it is a Blind polytope. Two copies can be augmented to make an icosahedral bipyramid which is also a Blind Polytope.

The regular 600-cell has icosahedral pyramids around every vertex.

The dual to the icosahedral pyramid is the dodecahedral pyramid, seen as a dodecahedral base, and 12 regular pentagonal pyramids meeting at an apex.

References

External links

  
 
 Richard Klitzing, Axial-Symmetrical Edge Facetings of Uniform Polyhedra
 Icosahedral pyramid

4-polytopes